Guy Waldo Dunnington (January 15, 1906, Bowling Green, Missouri – April 10, 1974, Natchitoches, Louisiana) was a writer, historian and professor of German known for his writings on the famous German mathematician Carl Friedrich Gauss. Dunnington wrote several articles about Gauss and later a biography entitled Gauss: Titan of Science. He became interested in Gauss through one of his elementary school teachers, Minna Waldeck Gauss Reeves, who was a great-granddaughter of Gauss.

Dunnington was also a translator at the Nuremberg trials. He ended his teaching career at Northwestern State University, which houses his collection of Gauss-related material, believed to be the largest collection of its kind in the world. He became Dean of international students there near the end of his life.

References

Bibliography

External links
 Collection of letters Dunnington exchanged with descendants of Gauss 

1906 births
1974 deaths
American male biographers
American historians of mathematics
20th-century American biographers
People from Bowling Green, Missouri
20th-century American male writers